Little San Salvador Island, also known as Half Moon Cay, is one of about 700 islands that make up the archipelago of The Bahamas. It is located roughly halfway between Eleuthera and Cat Island, administratively in the Cat Island District. It is a private island, owned by Carnival Corporation & plc, which uses it as a port of call for the cruise ships it operates in the region.  Prior to being owned by Carnival, Little San Salvador was the private island of Norwegian Cruise Line.

Holland America Line purchased the island in December 1996 for a price of US$6 million. It has since developed  of the  island, with the stated goal of maintaining as much habitat as possible for wildlife. The island is also a significant nesting area for waterfowl. The island does not have deep water docking, requiring the use of tenders for cruise ship passengers to disembark and embark.

Activities offered on the island include swimming, sunbathing, scuba diving, jet-skiing, cycling, and snorkeling. Deep-sea fishing, parasailing, glass-bottom boat rides, and nature walks also are available. A variety of water toys are available for rent, including Hobie catamarans, Sunfish sailboats, windsurfing sailboards, and kayaks. There are volleyball and basketball courts, horseshoes, shuffleboard, a fitness trail with exercise stations, horseback riding, and nature trails for hiking.

Etymology 
The indigenous Lucayan people called the island Guateo, meaning "distant land".

References

External links 

 Bahamas Ministry of Tourism

Resorts in the Bahamas
Holland America Line
Private islands of the Bahamas